Reiner Kunze (born 16 August 1933 in Oelsnitz, Erzgebirge, Saxony) is a German writer and GDR dissident. He studied media and journalism at the University of Leipzig. In 1968, he left the GDR state party SED following the communist Warsaw Pact countries invasion of Czechoslovakia in response to the Prague Spring. He had to publish his work under various pseudonyms. In 1976, his most famous book The Lovely Years, which contained critical insights into the life, and the policies behind the Iron Curtain, was published in West Germany  to great acclaim.  In 1977, the GDR regime expatriated him, and he moved to West Germany (FRG). He now lives near Passau in Bavaria.

His writings consists mostly of poetry, though he wrote prose as well, including essays. He is also a translator of Czech poetry and prose.

Kunze was a victim of the Stasi's  psychological warfare program.

In 2009, he was awarded the Thüringer Literaturpreis.

Works 

 Die Zukunft sitzt am Tische. 1955 (with Egon Günther)
 Vögel über dem Tau. Liebesgedichte und Lieder. 1959
 Fragen des lyrischen Schaffens. 1960 (Beiträge zur Gegenwartsliteratur, Issue 18)
 Widmungen. 1963
 Die guten Sitten. 1964 (with Heinz Knobloch)
 Sensible Wege. 1969
 Der Löwe Leopold, fast Märchen, fast Geschichten. 1970
 Zimmerlautstärke. 1972
 Briefe mit blauem Siegel. 1973
 Die Wunderbaren Jahre. 1976
 Das Märchen vom Dis (The Tale of Dis). 1976
 Die Wunderbaren Jahre. 1979 [movie script]
 Auf eigene Hoffnung. 1981
 Gespräch mit der Amsel. 1984
 Eines Jeden Einziges Leben. 1986
 Zurückgeworfen auf sich Selbst. Interviews (1984–1988), 1989
 Das weiße Gedicht. 1989
 Deckname Lyrik. 1990
 Wohin der Schlaf sich Schlafen Legt. 1991
 Am Sonnenhang, Tagebuch eines Jahres. 1993
 Steine und Lieder: Namibische Notizen und Fotos. 1996
 Ein Tag auf Dieser Erde. 1998
 Nocturne in E. 2001 (with Andreas Felger)
 Die Aura der Wörter. 2002
 Der Kuß der Koi. 2002
 Wo wir zu Hause das Salz haben. 2003
 Bleibt Nur Die Eigne Stirn. 2005
 Lindennacht. 2007
 Die Stunde mit dir selbst. Gedichte. S. Fischer, Frankfurt am Main 2018, .

Awards 

Source:

 1968 Übersetzerpreis des Tschechoslowakischen Schriftstellerverbandes
 1971 Deutscher Jugendbuchpreis
 1973 Großer Literaturpreis der Bayerischen Akademie der Schönen Künste and Mölle Literature Prize, Sweden
 1977 , Austria, Andreas-Gryphius-Preis and Georg Büchner Prize
 1979 Bavarian Film Awards, Best Screenplay
 1981 Geschwister Scholl-Preis
 1984 Eichendorff-Literaturpreis
 1988 Bavarian Order of Merit
 1989 Kulturpreis Ostbayerns
 1990 Herbert und Elsbeth Weichmann-Preis and Hanns Martin Schleyer Prize
 1993 Commander's Cross of the Order of Merit of the Federal Republic of Germany, Kulturpreis deutscher Freimaurer and Honorary doctorate Technische Universität Dresden
 1995 Honorary citizenship of the city of Greiz and Culture award of the district of Passau
 1997 
 1999 Friedrich-Hölderlin-Preis
 2000 Christian Ferber-Ehrengabe der Deutschen Schillerstiftung
 2001  and Bavarian Maximilian Order for Science and Art
 2002 
 2003 Ján Smrek Prize and honorary citizenship of the city of Oelsnitz, Erzgebirge
 2004 STAB-Preis der Stiftung für Abendländische Besinnung and Czech translation prize Premia Bohemica
 2006 Guest of Honor of the Heinrich-Heine-Haus Lüneburg
 2008 Order of Merit of the Free State of Thuringia
 2009  and Thüringer Literaturpreis
 2013 Robert Schuman Medal, EPP Group
 2013 America Award for a lifetime contribution to international writing

British/American editions 
 The Lovely Years
 In Time of Need: A Conversation about Poetry, Resistance & Exile (with Mireille Gansel)
 ''Zimmerlautstarke With the Volume Down Low (Swamp Press, 1981)

References

External links 
 
 Tabellarische Kurzbiografie zu Reiner Kunze (bis 1999)

1933 births
Living people
People from Erzgebirgskreis
Socialist Unity Party of Germany members
Dissidents
East German writers
Writers from Saxony
Translators from Czech
Translators to German
German poets
20th-century German translators
German male poets
German-language poets
Leipzig University alumni
Georg Büchner Prize winners
Commanders Crosses of the Order of Merit of the Federal Republic of Germany
Recipients of the Order of Merit of the Free State of Saxony